Hannes Gebhard (8 April 1864 – 23 February 1933) was a Finnish economist, cooperative movement activist and politician. He was a member of the Parliament of Finland from 1907 to 1909, representing the Finnish Party. He was born in Kemijärvi, and was married to Hedvig Gebhard.

He is buried in the Hietaniemi Cemetery in Helsinki.

References

1864 births
1933 deaths
People from Kemijärvi
People from Oulu Province (Grand Duchy of Finland)
Finnish people of German descent
Finnish Party politicians
Members of the Parliament of Finland (1907–08)
Members of the Parliament of Finland (1908–09)
University of Helsinki alumni
Burials at Hietaniemi Cemetery